Frank Wilson may refer to:

Entertainment
 Frank Wilson (director) (1873–?), British actor, writer and film director
 Frank H. Wilson (1886–1956), African American actor
 Frank Wilson (Australian actor) (1924–2005), Australian actor
 Frank Avray Wilson (1914–2009), British artist
 Frank Wilson (musician) (1940–2012), songwriter and record producer for Motown Records
 Frank Wilson (journalist) (born 1941), retired book editor of the Philadelphia Inquirer
 J. Frank Wilson, American singer

Politics and law
 Frank Wilson (politician) (1859–1918), Premier of Western Australia
 Frank O'Brien Wilson (1883–1962), Royal Navy officer, later settled in Kenya
 Frank Wiley Wilson (1917–1982), United States federal judge
 Frank J. Wilson (judge) (died 1990), American judge in Illinois
 Frank E. Wilson (politician) (1857–1935), U.S. Representative from New York
 Frank J. Wilson (1887–1970), IRS agent who helped convict Al Capone
 Frank Woodrow Wilson (1923–2013), American businessman, lawyer, and politician
 Frank Wilson (diplomat) (born 1946), New Zealand diplomat

Sports
 Frank Wilson (baseball) (1901–1974), Major League Baseball outfielder
 Frank Wilson (footballer) (born 1904), Scottish footballer with Hamilton Academical
 Frank Wilson (umpire) (1890–1928), American baseball umpire
 Frank Wilson (American football) (born 1973), American college football coach
 Frank Wilson (rugby, born 1944), rugby union and rugby league footballer of the 1960s and 1970s
 Frank Wilson (rugby union, born 1885) (1885–1916), New Zealand rugby union player killed in WWI

Other
 Frank E. Wilson (bishop) (1885–1944), first Bishop of the Episcopal Diocese of Eau Claire
 F. P. Wilson (1889–1963), professor of English literature
 Frank Norman Wilson (1890–1952), American cardiologist

See also
 Francis Wilson (disambiguation)